Beauty Water (기기괴괴 성형수) is a Korean animated film directed by Cho Kyung-hun (조경훈) and produced by studio animal (스튜디오 애니멀).

Synopsis 

Han Yaeji, a young fat makeup artist, takes care of famous actors. She discovers the beauty product called "Beauty Water" that would allow her to remove her overweight and reshape her body to her liking. After a first purchase on the Internet, Yaeji enters a self-destructive paranoia as she discovers terrifying side effects that begin to affect her.

See also 
 South Korean animation
 Ghost Messenger

References

2020 animated films
South Korean animated films